Arundinelleae is a tribe of grasses with roughly 90 species in three genera, mainly distributed in tropical and subtropical areas. The tribe's sister group are the Andropogoneae, with which they are classified in supertribe Andropogonodae. All species in this tribe use C4 carbon fixation.

References

Panicoideae
Poaceae tribes